I Look I See is an album released by Yusuf Islam in 2003 which was aimed at children.  It contained nine songs, and each song was followed by a brief spoken word piece which told of the deeds of the Prophets of Islam, the Five Pillars of Islam and other Islamic practices.

Track listing
 "I Look I See"
 "Al Khaaliq"
 "Allahu Allahu"
 "Bismillah (I Am Muslim)"
 "Months In Islam (Extended)"
 "Sing Children Of The World"
 "Our Guide Is The Qur`an"
 "Your Mother"
 "Ta'la Al Badru 'Alayna"

2003 albums
Yusuf Islam albums
Religious works for children